Katherine "Kate" Wright ( Gillis) is a women's field hockey player from Canada. Wright was born on August 14, 1989, in Kingston, Ontario, Canada.

Wright is the most capped player with the Canada national team, playing 216 matches. She surpassed the Stephanie Jameson's previous record of 169 matches at the 2017 Women's Pan American Cup.  Wright has been captain of the national team since 2014.

Wright has represented Canada at two Commonwealth Games, in Glasgow 2014 and Gold Coast 2018. At the 2018 event, Wright captained Canada to their best finish in the tournament's history, coming in fifth place.

Wright has also once been named in the Pan American Elite Team by the Pan American Hockey Federation, in 2013.

References

External links
 
 
  (2010, 2014)
 
 Katherine Wright at the Lima 2019 Pan American Games

1989 births
Living people
Canadian female field hockey players
Sportspeople from Kingston, Ontario
Field hockey people from Ontario
Pan American Games medalists in field hockey
Pan American Games bronze medalists for Canada
Field hockey players at the 2015 Pan American Games
Pan American Games silver medalists for Canada
Field hockey players at the 2019 Pan American Games
KHC Leuven players
Medalists at the 2015 Pan American Games
Medalists at the 2019 Pan American Games
Commonwealth Games competitors for Canada
Field hockey players at the 2014 Commonwealth Games
Field hockey players at the 2018 Commonwealth Games